The Armstrong Siddeley Ounce was a small two-cylinder aero engine developed by Armstrong Siddeley in 1920. The engine was originally conceived as a test piece but ran very well and was put into production for early ultralight aircraft and use in target drones. The Ounce used two cylinders from the preceding Jaguar I radial engine.

Applications
Bristol Babe
1920 redesigns of the '1917 Type Aerial Target'

Specifications (Ounce)

See also

References

Notes

Bibliography

Gunston, Bill. World Encyclopedia of Aero Engines. Cambridge, England. Patrick Stephens Limited, 1989. 
Lumsden, Alec. British Piston Engines and their Aircraft. Marlborough, Wiltshire: Airlife Publishing, 2003. .

External links

AS Ounce information and images at the Power House Museum, Sydney, Australia

Ounce
1920s aircraft piston engines